Bromus carinatus is a species of brome grass known by the common names California brome and mountain brome.

Distribution
It is native to western North America from Alaska to northern Mexico, where it can be found in many types of habitat. It is known in parts of the American midwest and eastern North America as an introduced species.

Description
Bromus carinatus is a perennial bunchgrass growing in clumps 0.5 to 1.5 meters tall, with many narrow leaves up to 40 centimeters long. The inflorescence is a spreading or drooping array of flat spikelets longer than they are wide.

The grass is wind-pollinated but is also sometimes cleistogamous, so that the flowers pollinate themselves, especially under stressful conditions. It also reproduces vegetatively via tillers.

This species is highly variable.  It can be easily confused with B. catharticus and B. stamineus.

Uses
This grass is used for control of erosion and revegetation of damaged land, as well as a highly palatable forage for livestock; however, it has the capacity to become a noxious weed in agricultural settings.

References

External links
Jepson Manual Treatment - Bromus carinatus
USDA Plants Profile
Forest Service Fire Ecology
Bromus carinatus - Photo gallery

carinatus
Bunchgrasses of North America
Native grasses of California
Grasses of Mexico
Grasses of the United States
Flora of Northwestern Mexico
Flora of the Southwestern United States
Flora of the Northwestern United States
Flora of Alaska
Flora of the California desert regions
Flora of the Cascade Range
Flora of the Sierra Nevada (United States)
Natural history of the California chaparral and woodlands
Natural history of the California Coast Ranges
Natural history of the Mojave Desert
Natural history of the Peninsular Ranges
Natural history of the San Francisco Bay Area
Natural history of the Santa Monica Mountains
Natural history of the Transverse Ranges
Flora without expected TNC conservation status